Dolič is a settlement in the Municipality of Destrnik in northeastern Slovenia. It lies just south of Destrnik on the regional road from Ptuj to Lenart v Slovenskih Goricah. The area is part of the traditional region of Styria. The municipality is now included in the Drava Statistical Region.

References

External links
Dolič on Geopedia

Populated places in the Municipality of Destrnik